Dorian Railean (born 13 October 1993) is a Moldovan footballer who plays as a goalkeeper for Liga II side Unirea Dej.

Honours
ACSF Comuna Recea
Liga III : 2019–20

References

External links
 
 

1993 births
Living people
Footballers from Chișinău
Moldovan footballers
Moldova youth international footballers
Moldova international footballers
Association football goalkeepers
Moldovan Super Liga players
FC Tiraspol players
FC Sfîntul Gheorghe players
FC Dacia Chișinău players
CS Petrocub Hîncești players
Liga II players
CS Academica Recea players
FC Unirea Dej players
Moldovan expatriate footballers
Expatriate footballers in Romania
Moldovan expatriate sportspeople in Romania